Chester Aaron (May 9, 1923 – August 30, 2019) was an American writer.

Early life and education
He was born in Butler, Pennsylvania to Albert and Celia (Charleson) Aaron.

He attended the following schools: Butler Senior High School, UCLA, UC Berkeley, and San Francisco State University.

Career
In addition to his writing, he has worked as a steel worker, an X-ray technician, a college professor, and a garlic farmer.

Works
For young adults:
 Better than Laughter (Harcourt Brace Jovanovich, 1972)
 Translated into German by Irmela Bender, illustrated by Willi Glasauer, and published by Beltz & Gelberg (Weinheim, Germany):
 Besser also Lachen: Kinderroman [Better Than Laughter], 1976, 
 Im Wettlauf mit der Zeit [...] [In A Race Against Time], 1991, 

 An American Ghost, illustrated by David Lemon (Harcourt, 1973); reprinted 2011 by Zumaya Publications
 Hello to Bodega (Atheneum Books, 1976)
 Spill (Atheneum, 1978)
 Catch Calico! (E. P. Dutton, 1979)
 Gideon: A Novel (J. B. Lippincott & Co., 1982) 
 Duchess (Lippincott, 1982)
 Out of Sight, Out of Mind (Lippincott, 1985)
 Lackawanna: A Novel (Lippincott, 1986)
 Alex, Who Won His War (New York: Walker Publ. Co., 1991) 
 Willa's Poppy (Zumaya, 2005)
 Home to the Sea (Brown Barn Books, 2008)

For adults:
 The Cowbank (1955) – play produced at University of California Berkeley
 About Us: A Novel (McGraw-Hill, 1967); reprinted 2012 by Zumaya – autobiographical novel
 Garlic Is Life: A Memoir with Recipes (Berkeley: Ten Speed Press, 1996)
 The Great Garlic Book: A Guide with Recipes (Ten Speed Press, 1997)
 Garlic Kisses: Human Struggles with Garlic Connections (Milan OH: Mostly Garlic, 2001); reprinted 2004 by Zumaya 
 Black and Blue Jew: A Novel (Creative Arts, 2002)
 Whispers (Zumaya., 2004)
 Symptoms of Terminal Passion (El Leon Literary Arts, 2006)
 Murder by Metaphor, (Zumaya, 2009)
 25 Loves (Andrea Young Arts, 2009)
 About Them: A Novel (El Literary Arts–Manoa Books, 2011)

References

Contemporary Authors Online. The Gale Group, 2002. PEN (Permanent Entry Number):  0000000011.

External links 

 

Writers from Pittsburgh
1923 births
2019 deaths
University of California, Los Angeles alumni
University of California, Berkeley alumni
San Francisco State University alumni